Women & Therapy is a quarterly peer-reviewed academic journal covering behavioral science, feminist psychology, mental health, psychological science, and psychotherapy. It was established in 1982 and is published by Taylor & Francis. The editor-in-chief is Ellyn Kaschak (San Jose State University).

Abstracting and indexing 
The journal is abstracted and indexed in:

According to the Journal Citation Reports, the journal has a 2015 impact factor of 0.229, ranking it 34th out of 41 journals in the category "Women's Studies".

See also 
 List of women's studies journals

References

External links 
 

Psychology journals
Quarterly journals
Taylor & Francis academic journals
Women's studies journals
English-language journals
Publications established in 1982
Women's health
Psychotherapy journals
Women and psychology